The Statutes of Iona, passed in Scotland in 1609, required that Highland Scottish clan chiefs send their heirs to Lowland Scotland to be educated in English-speaking Protestant schools. As a result, some clans, such as the MacDonalds of Sleat and the MacLeods of Harris, adopted the new religion. Other Clans, notably the MacLeans of Morvern & Mull, MacDonalds of Clanranald, Keppoch, Glengarry, and Glencoe, remained resolutely Roman Catholic.

Provisions
Among the provisions of the statutes were:
The provision and support of Protestant ministers to Highland Parishes
The establishment of inns "to be set up in convenient places in all the Islands for accommodation of travellers" and to end the custom of "sorning", the practice of extorting free quarters and provision
The outlawing of beggars
The prohibition of general import and sale of wine and whisky, except to chiefs and other gentlemen who were permitted to purchase wine and aquavitae from the Lowlands for household consumption
The education of the children of any "gentleman or yeoman" in possession of more than sixty cattle in Lowland schools where they "may be found able sufficiently to speik, reid and wryte Englische"
Prohibition from carrying hagbuts or pistols out of their own houses, or shooting at deer, hares, or fowls
The outlawing of bards and other bearers of the traditional culture "pretending libertie to baird and flattir," and that all such persons should be apprehended, put in the stocks, and expelled from the Islands
The prohibition on the protection of fugitives

In the view of some writers, these provisions were "the first of a succession of measures taken by the Scottish government specifically aimed at the extirpation of the Gaelic language, the destruction of its traditional culture and the suppression of its bearers"

Further reading
  Cathcart, Alison. "The Statutes of Iona: The Archipelagic Context," Journal of British Studies Jan. 2010, Vol. 49, No. 1: 4–27.

References

External links
History of Scottish Gaelic
Were the Highlands Politically unstable 1660–1700

Scots law
Education in Scotland
1609 in Scotland
1609 in law
Social history of Scotland